After gaining independence, Azerbaijan has taken important measures throughout the country to improve its legal system, enhance justice and efficiency.

Background 

On 18 October 1991 Azerbaijan re-established its independence according to the Constitutional Act on Restoration of the State Independence of the Republic of Azerbaijan. Azerbaijani law system is based on civil law system. Constitution of Azerbaijan is the highest legal force in the country which was accepted in 1995 as the result of nationwide referendum. The separation of powers among legislative, judicial and executive branches were formed according to the Constitution.

The legislative system of the Republic of Azerbaijan consists of normative-legal Acts as those:

the Constitution, acts adopted by referendum, laws, orders, Resolutions of the Cabinet of Ministers of Azerbaijan, Normative Acts of central executive power bodies. International Treaties, of which Azerbaijan is a party, compose an essential part of the legislative system of the Azerbaijan.

Separation of Powers 
According to the Constitution, Azerbaijan is a democratic, legal, secular and unitary republic. Religion is separated from the State. State power is divided among 3 divisions: Milli Majlis (legislative), President (executive), and courts (judicial). Milli Majlis is one chamber body with 125 parliamentarians selected for 5 years term. The Head of the State of Azerbaijan is the President who is elected for 7 years term. Vice-president is the second-highest constitutional officer after the President in Azerbaijan, appointed and dismissed by the President. President forms Cabinet of Ministers with the leading of Prime Minister to implement executive power. Judicial power is implemented through Constitutional Court, Supreme Court, Courts of Appeal, ordinary and other specialized law courts.

Legislative reform 
After adaptation of Constitution (1995), new legislative acts and amendments were issued in line with democratic principles and in consistency with requirements of international law within the legal reforms.

Constitution and Constitutional Acts 
 Constitutional Law of the Republic of Azerbaijan on regulating the realization of human rights and freedoms in the Republic of Azerbaijan (29 December 1998);
 Constitutional Law of the Republic of Azerbaijan on Approval of the Constitution of Nakhchivan Autonomous Republic (24 December 2002);
 Constitutional Law of the Republic of Azerbaijan on Normative Legal Acts (21 December 2010).

Codes 
 Labor Code of the Republic of Azerbaijan (1 February 1999);
 The Civil Code of the Azerbaijan Republic (28 December 1999);
 The Civil Procedural Code of the Republic of Azerbaijan (28 December 1999);
 Family Code of the Republic of Azerbaijan (28 December 1999);
 Criminal Code of the Republic of Azerbaijan (30 December 1999);
 Code on Administrative offences of the Republic of Azerbaijan (11 July 2000);
 Tax Code of the Republic of Azerbaijan (11 July 2000);
 Code of Criminal Procedure of the Republic of Azerbaijan (14 July 2000);
 Code of Execution of Penalties of the Republic of Azerbaijan (14 July 2000);
 Election Code of the Republic of Azerbaijan (27 May 2003);
 Administrative Procedural Code of the Republic of Azerbaijan (June 30, 2009);
 Housing Code of the Republic of Azerbaijan (15 November 2011)
 Migration Code of the Republic of Azerbaijan (2 July 2013).

Laws 
 Law of the Republic of Azerbaijan on Freedom of Religious Belief (20 August 1992);
 Law of the Azerbaijan Republic on prevention of disablement, rehabilitation and social security of disabled persons (25 August 1992);
 Law on copyrights and related rights of the Republic of Azerbaijan (5 June 1996);
 Law of the Azerbaijan Republic on procedures for review of citizen applications (June 10, 1997);
 Law of the Republic of Azerbaijan on freedom of information (19 June 1998);
 Law of the Republic of Azerbaijan on state protection of persons participating in criminal proceedings (11 December 1998);
 Law on Normative Legal Acts of the republic of Azerbaijan (26 November 1999);
 Law on advocates and advocacy activities (28 December 1999);
 Law of the Republic of Azerbaijan on Civil Service (21 July 2000);
 Law of the Republic of Azerbaijan on state registration and state registry of legal entities (December 12, 2003);
 Law of the Republic of Azerbaijan on combating corruption (13 January 2004);
 Law of the Republic of Azerbaijan on State Guarantees of Equal Rights for Women and Men (10 October 2006).

Judicial reform 
Decree on Modernization of Judicial system was signed on 19 January 2006 by the President of Azerbaijan and the country entered the next step in judicial system. New courts, as well as new appeal courts in regions were established to increase the effectiveness of justice and to make easier to access to courts for people in regions. Number of judges increased, court activities modernized, newly established courts were organized, and the apparatus of courts upgraded based on the Decree. New judicial system appointed appeal courts (composed of 4 chambers – Civil, Criminal, Military and Administrative-Economic) in 6 regions of Azerbaijan to fulfill their duties on territorial jurisdiction.

The courts of Nakhchivan Autonomous Republic were set up in accordance with the blockade situation of the territory. The Supreme Court of Nakhchivan Autonomous Republic is the first-degree appeal instance for courts of Nakhchivan. The cassation instance for the Supreme Court of Nakhchivan AR is Supreme Court of Azerbaijan Republic.

New mechanism of appealing directly to the Constitutional Court regarding the restoration of violated rights and freedoms was defined according to the Law on Constitutional Court (23 December 2003). The Amendments to the  “Law on Courts and Judges” and “Law on Judicial-Legal Council” adopted as a result of cooperating with Council of Europe have played an important role in increasing effectiveness of justice. Judicial-Legal Council was set up referring to these acts, which are consistent with international principles.

The new legislation regulates the immunity of the judges and their terms of office, indefinite term of appointment to the judge's office has been defined, disciplinary responsibility of judges has been assigned to the authority of the Judicial-Legal Council, and a new body - Judges Selection Committee has been established to elect the candidates for judge positions.

Influential international financial institutions also supported the judicial-legal reforms carried out in Azerbaijan. For example, a joint project of the Ministry of Justice and World Bank entitled “Modernization of the Justice Sector” implemented in the country. In the framework of the project, numerous court buildings were constructed, the infrastructure in this area was updated and the most up-to-date technologies was introduced in the courts.

The role of prosecuting authorities in the judicial system was also reviewed in the framework of legal and judicial reforms, and its activities have been adapted to international standards and to the requirements of democratic institutions. Thus, a number of previous competences of public prosecution were revoked, warrant to issue arrests was granted to the courts, supervision over courts by Prosecutor's office were eliminated according to the “Law on Prosecutor's Office” (1999). As a result, the Prosecutor's Office of Azerbaijan became the independent body to start criminal case, carry out preliminary investigation, oversee the implementation of laws in the activities of investigative and operational-search bodies, and represent as a claimant on behalf of the state in civil issues.

Judicial-Legal Council 
The Judicial-Legal Council of Azerbaijan was formed in February 2005 to implement self-governance functions of Judiciary system as the result of legal-judicial reforms in Azerbaijan. The Council consists of 15 members (9 of them are Judges and others are representatives of President, Parliament, Prosecutor's Office, Bar Association, Ministry of Justice) who are selected by Milli Majlis.

As a permanently functioning independent body, The Judicial-Legal Council is not dependent on legislative, executive or judicial authorities, local self-governance bodies, individuals and legal entities for organizational, financial or other issues. The council is in charge with the organization of the judiciary system and independence of judges in Azerbaijan Republic; organization of selection of candidates to vacant judge positions who are not yet judges; evaluation of performance of judges; promotion, rotation of judges, as well as, other issues related to courts and judges.

Constitution of Azerbaijan, international treaties to which it is a party, the law on Judicial-Legal Council, law on “Courts and Judges” and other legislative acts are the legal basis for the activity of the Judicial-Legal Council. It cooperates with legislative, executive and judicial authorities, Azerbaijan Bar Association, and scientific institutions.

Besides, a special training department under the council was set up to carry out training for judges and public prosecutors, including candidates to judge posts. According to new method of judge selection, multistage procedures, including testing, written and oral exams were developed starting from 2005. On the other hand, long-term training courses were organized for candidates to judge posts and a number of higher judges, prominent legal scientists, experts from different countries including Turkey; Commissioner for Human Rights of Council of Europe, Judges of European Court of Human Rights, specialists of ABA/CEELI took part in these courses.

As the result of assessment of judicial staff's activity, powers of up to 40 judges have been terminated, personnel of courts have been renewed, new courts, as well as regional appeal courts have been established, and number of judges have risen by 50%.

Constitutional reform 
Taking into account the need to strengthen democratic values, implement judicial-legal reforms, protect human and civil rights and freedoms, amendments to the text of Constitution were made several times. In 2002, 2009 and 2016 the text of Constitution was amended and enriched by new provisions due to the results of referendums held through the country. The social-economic, public-political and cultural life of the country started to develop, large-scale infrastructure and construction project implemented in regard with the amendments.

Referendum 2002 

The first referendum for amendments to the text of Constitution initiated by the former President Heydar Aliyev was held in 2002, 24 August. 39 changes were done to the 23 articles of the Constitution. These changes are categorized into 7 main groups, as
 Changes arising from commitments undertaken by Azerbaijan Republic to European Council;
 Changes arising from the accession of Azerbaijan Republic to European Convention on protection of human rights and fundamental freedoms;
 Changes arising from the improvement of conducting referendum;
 Changes to election process to Parliament of Azerbaijan Republic;
 Changes to election process of the President of Azerbaijan Republic;
 Changes arising from the improvement the activity of state authorities;
 Changes arising from the implementation of judicial reforms.
According to these amendments, proportional party list elections to Parliament was eliminated; citizen of the country, courts and human right commissioner gained right to appeal directly to the Constitutional Court of the Republic of Azerbaijan; the procedure of transferring the powers of President to the Prime Minister instead of the Chairman of Milli Majlis in case of resignation was approved; the procedure of calculating the results of the presidential elections with a simple majority was defined.

Referendum 2009 

The second Referendum Act on “Amendments and additions to the Constitution of the Republic of Azerbaijan” was put to a nationwide referendum on March 18, 2009. As a result, the Constitution was further upgraded and constitutional norms and principles were adapted to the requirements of the time with 41 amendments to 29 articles.

The constitutional amendments of March 18, 2009 can be classified in 3 groups on several aspects:
 The first classification is related to the enrichment of constitutional norms that define human rights and freedoms, the identification of new opportunities, the broader assurance and the formation of a more effective defense mechanism. E.g. the provision of "providing adequate standard of living for the citizens of the Republic of Azerbaijan" to the Article 12. Article 17 that defines constitutional foundations of family, children and state relations was enriched with 4 new sections of greater importance. The content of Article 25 that defines right for equality; Article 32 that defines right for personal immunity and Article 71 that ensures the rights and liberties of a human being and citizen were enhanced with several new provisions;
 The second aspect was the further improvement of the constitutional provisions that define the mechanism of the state power. Thus, it was supposed to make amendments and additions to the articles regarding the organization and activity of the Milli Majlis, as well as some articles defining the legal status of the President and the judiciary power. “The term of office of the President of Azerbaijan Republic and Milli Majlis is extended until the end of the military operations in case the conduct of military operations does not allow holding elections” was added to Article 84 and Article 101;
 Another aspect of the amendments was related to the improvement of the constitutional status of local self-government, in particular the independence of municipalities. Article 146 that defines the independence of municipalities, was enlarged with 4 new parts. New provisions define the independence of municipalities while defining its responsibilities for the citizens living in the municipality, exercising its power independently not undermining sovereignty of Azerbaijani state, and reporting to the Milli Majlis about the activities of municipalities in cases and in the manner prescribed by law.

Referendum 2016 

The third referendum for amendments to the text of Constitution initiated by the President Ilham Aliyev was held on September 26, 2016. 34 amendments and additions to 23 articles, as well as 6 new articles that change the structure of the Constitution were made according to the results of the Referendum.

Amendments are divided into 2 main categories: 
 enrichment of human rights and freedoms, adaptation to international universal and regional legal acts, improvement of safeguards and defense mechanisms;
 improvement of principle of separation of powers, “confrontation and balance” mechanism, as well as political management and local self-governance activities.
Within the first aspect, protection of human dignity and respect for it, and non-discrimination principles were added to Article 24; provision on the protection of the rights of persons with disabilities were added to Article 25; Article 32 provides the right of personal immunity (e.g. the provision of safeguarding of the protection of personal data), Article 36 prohibits lockouts for the protection of the rights of persons employed under labor contract (except in cases prescribed by law); Article 60 was amended to enhance the administrative and judicial support for rights and freedoms according to the results of the 2016 referendum.

Within the second aspect, the age limit for appointment and selection to certain posts was eliminated in Articles 85, 100, 121 and 126 as the result of Referendum. Provision 103.1 that defines forming vice-president institute was added to Article 103; and several amendments to Article 105 and 106 were done arising from provision 103.1.

Ombudsman Office 
As becoming a participant in the work of Council of Europe since 1996, Azerbaijan started to develop an effective mechanism to improve national legislation to the level of European standards. In the framework of this activity, On February 22, 1998, the President of Azerbaijan issued a decree “On Measures for Ensuring Human and Civil Rights and Freedoms” and based on this decree, State Program on Protection of Human Rights was approved by the Decree of 18 June 1998. In the framework of this Program, Ombudsman Institute was set up. It happened on December 28, 2001, after The Constitutional Law “On the Commissioner for Human Rights (Ombudsman) of the Republic of Azerbaijan” was adopted. There were several amendments done to this law on 1 September 2004, 3 March 2006, 19 October 2007, 19 June 2009, 26 November 2009, 6 May 2011, 24 June 2011, 27 June 2014 and on 15 April 2016.

Elmira Süleymanova was appointed as the Commissioner for Human Rights (Ombudsman) according to the Decision No. 362 of the Parliament of Azerbaijan on July 2, 2002.

The main objective of this institute is to restore violated human rights and freedoms in accordance with the Constitution of Azerbaijan and the international treaties to which Azerbaijan is a party. Investigation of activities of the President, parliamentarians and judges of Azerbaijan are not the subjects of authorities of the Commissioner. The Ombudsman's activities in the field of human rights include the protection of human and civil rights and freedoms, controlling and analyzing of the status of the human and civil rights. Commissioner also deals with defining shortcomings and violations, and restores and prevents the violations of human rights.

Ombudsman Institute is also in charge with the national preventive mechanism envisaged under the Optional Protocol to the “Convention against torture and other cruel, inhuman or degrading treatment or punishment” according to the Order of the President of Azerbaijan on 13 January 2009.

One of the important steps in the field of human rights was the adoption of the National Action Plan on Protection of Human Rights in the Republic of Azerbaijan. The National Action Plan was prepared on the basis of proposals by a number of state agencies, including the Ministry of Foreign Affairs, and was approved by Presidential Decree No. 1889 of 28 December 2006.

In 2007–2008, a number of measures were taken to implement the National Action Plan on the Protection of Human Rights in the Republic of Azerbaijan; and to protect human and civil rights and freedoms, provide the rule of law, as well as to develop civil society. With regard to the planning the implementation of these measures in these areas, website of the National Human Rights Action Plan (NHRAP) is planned to be established by the initiative of Ombudsman's Office. The website is going to provide information on the status of the NHRAP implementation, periodic reports, views of working groups and other information.

Legal e-services portal 
Unified Judicial Portal of the Republic of Azerbaijan is a legal e-services portal developed for the judicial system of the country by the initiative of The Ministry of Justice. The portal was developed within the framework of the Project on Modernization of Legal System implemented jointly with World Bank. It offers electronic services through which citizens can get information about working hours, locations of judicial institutions, registration of NGOs, rules of running notarial acts and other documents, fees and execution of judgments. It is possible to make an appointment with the employees of judiciary bodies via online regime of the portal.

International relations

Council of Europe 
Azerbaijan took part in the work of Council of Europe as a special guest since 28 June 1996, and became a full member on 25 January 2001. In order to establish effective mechanism to develop national legislation to the level of European standards, a number of measures was carried out, as signing orders by the President of Azerbaijan, on  “The implementation of the measures of the program of cooperation between the Council of Europe and the Republic of Azerbaijan” (July 8, 1996); “The measures aimed at expanding cooperation between the Council of Europe and the Republic of Azerbaijan” (January 20, 1998); “The measures for expanding cooperation between the Council of Europe and the Republic of Azerbaijan and for protecting the interests of the Republic of Azerbaijan in the Council of Europe” (May 14, 1999). According to these orders, it was started to adapt criminal, criminal-procedure, civil, civil-procedure codes of Azerbaijan Republic to European standards and norms. In the framework of this measure, parliament adopted laws “On the Constitutional Court”, “On Courts and Judges”, “On Police”, “On Prosecutor’s Office”, “Advocates and Advocacy”. Death penalty was abolished in 1998. Presidential decree “On the measures for ensuring human and civil rights and freedoms” (February 22, 1998) was adopted to implement measures in the field of human rights. “The state program on the protection of human rights” was issued on February 22, 1998, to improve legal mechanisms, develop cooperation with international organizations and train specialists in implementation of their duties. “Law on mass media” was adopted in December 1999 as a result of cooperation with Council of Europe to abolish censorship on mass media.

After becoming a full member of Council of Europe, Azerbaijan adopted a constitutional law “On the Commissioner (Ombudsman) on human rights of the Republic of Azerbaijan” on December 28, 2001, to form the ombudsman institution in the country. The European Convention on Human Rights and its protocols No. 1, 4, 6 and 7 were ratified by the Parliament on December 25, 2001.

European Court of Human Rights 
Azerbaijan recognized the jurisdiction of the European Court of Human Rights on April 15, 2002, after ratification the European Convention for the Protection of Human Rights and Fundamental Freedoms by Parliament of Azerbaijan. Supreme Court and other judicial authorities were recommended to arrange study of the case law of the European Court according to the order “On Modernization of Judiciary System” by the President of Azerbaijan. As a result, the decree “On application of the provisions of the European Convention on the Protection of human rights and fundamental freedoms” precedents of European Court of Human Rights" (30 March 2006) was adopted by the Plenum of the Supreme Court of Azerbaijani Republic.

Projects 
 Completed project: Improving the efficiency and quality of judicial services in the Republic of Azerbaijan.
 Ongoing projects: Application of the European Convention on Human Rights and the case-law of the European Court of Human Rights in Azerbaijan;Further support to the penitentiary reform in Azerbaijan.

World Bank 
World Bank initiated financial support to Azerbaijan in the area of legal reforms. The projects of constructing 30 court buildings and complexes, new buildings with cutting-edge information technology for 4 regional courts were implemented during 2006-2014 within the cooperation with WB. Moreover, Constitutional Court and Supreme Court. Judicial-Legal Council, Ministry of Justice have been provided with modern information and communication technologies, a single internet portal of the judicial system has been established, more than 1500 judges, and personnel of legal and judicial system have been trained in order to improve their knowledge on ICTs.

Projects 
 Judicial Modernization Project (completed);
 Judicial Services and Smart Infrastructure Project: Environmental management plan (in progress).

See also 
 Reforms in Azerbaijan
 Law of Azerbaijan
 Judiciary of Azerbaijan

References 

Azerbaijan
Reform in Azerbaijan